George William Barrington, 7th Viscount Barrington, PC (14 February 1824 – 6 November 1886), was a British Conservative politician. He held office under Lord Salisbury as Captain of the Yeomen of the Guard between 1885 and 1886 and as Captain of the Honourable Corps of Gentlemen-at-Arms in 1886.

Early life
Barrington was born at Lower Brook Street, London, on 14 February 1824.  He was the eldest son of William Barrington, 6th Viscount Barrington, and his wife the Hon. Jane Elizabeth, daughter of Thomas Liddell, 1st Baron Ravensworth. His younger brother was the diplomat William Barrington.

He was educated at Christ Church, Oxford.

Career
Barrington was returned to Parliament for Eye in 1866. The following year he succeeded his father in the viscountcy but as this was an Irish peerage he did not have to resign his seat in the House of Commons. In 1874 he was sworn of the Privy Council and appointed Vice-Chamberlain of the Household in the Conservative administration of Benjamin Disraeli, a post he held until the government was defeated in the 1880 general election.

The latter year Barrington was created Baron Shute, of Beckett in the County of Berkshire, in the Peerage of the United Kingdom, which entitled him to an automatic seat in the House of Lords. The title was created with special remainder to his younger brother Percy. Barrington later served under Lord Salisbury as Captain of the Yeomen of the Guard from 1885 to January 1886 and as Captain of the Honourable Corps of Gentlemen-at-Arms between August 1886 and his sudden death in November of the same year.

Personal life
On 19 February 1846, Lord Barrington was married to Isabel Elizabeth, daughter of John Morritt of Rokeby Park and Mary Baillie (a daughter of Peter Baillie of Dochfour). Together, they had three daughters:

 Hon. Constance Mary Barrington (1847–1926), who married Lawrence Palk, 2nd Baron Haldon.
 Hon. Evelyn Laura Barrington (1848–1924), who married George Craven, 3rd Earl of Craven.
 Hon. Florence Isabel Barrington (d. 1928), who became a Sister of the Community of St Mary the Virgin.

He died in office at Grimsthorpe Castle, Lincolnshire, in November 1886, after a few hours illness, aged 62. He was succeeded in his titles (in the barony of Shute according to the special remainder) by his younger brother Percy. Lady Barrington died in February 1898.

References

External links 
 
 

1824 births
1886 deaths
Alumni of Christ Church, Oxford
Members of the Privy Council of the United Kingdom
Conservative Party (UK) MPs for English constituencies
UK MPs 1865–1868
UK MPs 1868–1874
UK MPs 1874–1880
Barrington, V7
UK MPs who were granted peerages
Honourable Corps of Gentlemen at Arms
Peers of the United Kingdom created by Queen Victoria
George 7